Sugarland Run is a planned community and census-designated place in Loudoun County, Virginia, United States. The population at the 2010 census was 11,799. In 2020, it was estimated to be 12,956.

Geography 
The community is named for Sugarland Run, a stream which flows toward the Potomac along the east side of the community.

The CDP is connected by Virginia State Route 7 to Leesburg to the west and Reston, Tysons and Interstate 495 to the east. Nearby Virginia State Route 28 connects it to Sterling, Dulles International Airport, Dulles Town Center, Chantilly, Centreville and Manassas, all to the south. Virginia State Route 286 connects Sugarland Run to Reston and Herndon to the south and to Interstate 95 to the southeast. Virginia State Route 193 connects the CDP to Great Falls, Interstate 495 and McLean to the east.

Education

Primary and secondary education 
Students in Sugarland Run attend Loudoun County Public Schools. There are two elementary schools for the community, Sugarland Elementary and Meadowland Elementary. They are in Sugarland Run. Middle school students attend Seneca Ridge Middle School. High school students attend Dominion High School, which is the location of the county's gifted high school, Loudoun Academy of Science.

Tertiary education 
It is also three miles northeast of George Mason Loudoun.

Homeowners' associations 

Sugarland Run has three homeowners' associations — Sugarland Run Homeowners' Association, Sugarland Square Homeowners' Association and Sugarland Run Townhouse Homeowners' Association. Community amenities include:
 Community center
 an Olympic-size pool
 a wading pool for tots
 two tennis courts (one with pickleball)
 basketball courts
 volleyball court
 multi-purpose field
 fishing lake
 26 miles of paved wooded walking trails
 numerous playgrounds

Sugarland Run has four models of single-family homes (Balboa, Laguna, Malibu and Redondo). Some were built with garages, some had car ports. Owners have added garage/car ports and additions which adds variation to the style of the homes in the neighborhood. There are also townhouses (at least four models). These homes were built in the 1970s and 1980s. Most back to paved walking trails, woods or streams. In contrast to surrounding colonial-style neighborhoods, Sugarland Run homes are built in the California contemporary style with vaulted ceilings and modern exteriors.

References

Census-designated places in Loudoun County, Virginia
Washington metropolitan area
Census-designated places in Virginia